María del Monte Vasco Pes Gallardo (born December 26, 1975 in Viladecans) is a Spanish race walker. She won the bronze medal in the 20 km at the 2000 Summer Olympics in Sydney and the 2007 World Championships in Osaka. Vasco was also a gold and bronze medalist at the IAAF Race Walking Championships. She was born in Viladecans near Barcelona, Catalonia, Spain.

International competitions

References

External links

1975 births
Living people
Athletes from Barcelona
Spanish female racewalkers
Sportswomen from Catalonia
Olympic athletes of Spain
Olympic bronze medalists in athletics (track and field)
Athletes (track and field) at the 1996 Summer Olympics
Athletes (track and field) at the 2000 Summer Olympics
Athletes (track and field) at the 2004 Summer Olympics
Athletes (track and field) at the 2008 Summer Olympics
Athletes (track and field) at the 2012 Summer Olympics
World Athletics Championships athletes for Spain
World Athletics Championships medalists
Medalists at the 2000 Summer Olympics
Olympic bronze medalists for Spain
Mediterranean Games silver medalists for Spain
Mediterranean Games medalists in athletics
Athletes (track and field) at the 2005 Mediterranean Games
World Athletics Race Walking Team Championships winners